Dora the Explorer is an American animated television series created by Chris Gifford, Valerie Walsh Valdes, and Eric Weiner that premiered on Nickelodeon on August 14, 2000. The series is produced by Nickelodeon Animation Studio and is one of the longest-running series that aired on the Nick Jr. block.

Series overview

Episodes

Pilot (1999)
Before the show premiered, a 15-second animation test and a 15-minute pilot episode were produced. The pilot episode has been classed as "lost media" as it has not been released to the public except via storyboard diagrams and small clips.

Season 1 (2000–02)

Season 2 (2002–03)

Season 3 (2003–04)

Season 4 (2004–08)

Season 5 (2008–10)
Caitlin Sanchez replaces Kathleen Herles as the voice of Dora.

Season 6 (2010–12)

Season 7 (2012–13)

Season 8 (2013–15; 2019)
The final six episodes first aired in the United States from July 7, 2019, to August 9, 2019, to commemorate the release of Dora and the Lost City of Gold.

Notes

References

Dora the Explorer
Lists of American children's animated television series episodes
Lists of Nickelodeon television series episodes